Myripristis gildi, the Clipperton cardinal soldierfish, is a species of soldierfish belonging to the genus Myripristis. It is endemic to Clipperton Island in the Eastern Pacific Ocean. Its total length reaches at least 21.4cm.

References

gildi
Fish of the Pacific Ocean
Taxa named by David Wayne Greenfield